FiOS1 was a news-based pay television network that was carried by Verizon Fios in the New York metropolitan area. Launched on June 22, 2009 in Long Island and New Jersey and later on May 28, 2014 in the Lower Hudson Valley, FiOS1 provided hyper-local news, weather, traffic, sports and also original programming. FiOS1 was only available in Northern New Jersey, Long Island, and Lower Hudson Valley.

The networks focused on content produced by RNN, which produced the network's newscasts. Sports coverage featured local high schools and colleges such as Rutgers University, Hofstra University and Princeton University.

In 2013, the segment Restaurant Hunter received a New York Emmy Award in the "Entertainment Feature/Segment".

In August 2019, it was announced that FiOS1 would shut down through a WARN Act notice after RNN and Verizon could not come to an agreement on a contract extension. It was announced in September that Altice's News 12 would be added to the FiOS lineup beginning on November 4, 2019 as part of a wider deal to add their other news channels, Cheddar and i24 News. Although FiOS1 was intended to cease operations on November 15, 2019, near its closure, RNN announced via an email to its employees that FiOS1 would close early on November 13 (with its final newscast at 11 p.m.) as many of its employees were let go from their jobs. Immediately after its newscast, the websites and social network feeds were closed. Since 2021, all of FiOS1's websites became redirects to Verizon Fios' services.

From March 26, 2020, the former FiOS1 HD channel space (channel 501) was re-used for Verizon's "Pay it Forward Live", a weekly live program featured entertainment, mainly gaming and music, to support local businesses during the COVID-19 pandemic. This program concluded on May 28, and the channel was eventually removed from Fios altogether later that year.

Programming
At the time of its closure, FiOS1 provided the following programs in all regions:
FIOS1 News Morning Edition
FIOS1 News Evening Edition
FIOS1 News Weekend Edition
FIOS1 News Daytime Edition
FIOS1 News Now
Push Pause
Build
Yahoo Finance Market Movers

FiOS1 provided additional local programming for its other three regions:

Long Island: High Speed Fiber-Optic Internet Services Provider | Verizon Fios:
My Long Island TV
Restaurant Hunter
Heroes on our Island
Money & Main$treet
Traffic 360

New Jersey region:
State of Affairs
This is Jersey
One on One
Life and Living
Caucus New Jersey
New Jersey Means Business
The Caucus Educational Corporation once produced New Jersey Capital Report which was aired on FiOS 1 in New Jersey and ended its run in 2017

Lower Hudson Valley region:
Newsbreakers
Giants Access Blue
FiOS1 News This Week
Restaurant Hunter
Fitness Friday
FIOS1 News, Weather & Traffic

In addition, all FiOS1 regional channels aired local high school sports events in their respective regions weeknights from 7:30 p.m to 9:30 p.m.; most of these regional newscasts and high school sports events are pre-recorded. After FiOS1's closure, Restaurant Hunters and all of the high school sports broadcasts remained available on demand for FiOS customers. All of FiOS1's programs (with the exception of Verizon's Build, Yahoo Finance Market Movers, RNN's Richard French Live and programs made by the Caucus Educational Corporation) were canceled.

Notable staff

All regions 
 Geoff Bansen - Meteorologist, weekday mornings
 Brittany Borer - Meteorologist, weekday afternoons
 Joe Cioffi - Meteorologist, weekday evenings
 Jonathan Cubit - Meteorologist, weekend evenings
 Nicole Edenedo - Traffic Anchor / Entertainment Reporter, weekday mornings
 Larry Epstein - "Richard French Live" producer
 Brian Fitzgerald - Chief Meteorologist, weekday mornings
 Addison Green - Meteorologist, weekday afternoons (Now at KHOU11
 Christa Lauri - Host, "Money and Main $treet"
 Rob Petrone - "Restaurant Hunters" host
 Andrew Pineiro - Meteorologist, weekend mornings
 Joe Rao - Meteorologist, weekday evenings
 Lorin Richardson - Traffic Anchor, weekday mornings 
 Christine Sloan - "Restaurant Hunters" host
 Vineeth Thomas - Senior Web Editor, fios1news.com websites for all regions
 Justin Walters - Sports Reporter (now at CBS Sports and WPIX)

New Jersey 
 Mary-Lyn Buckley - reporter (now at the News 12 Networks)
 Nick Delgado - Reporter
 Nicole Edenedo - Morning Traffic Anchor / Entertainment Reporter
 Mike Gilliam - Anchor / Reporter
 Emily Girsch - Reporter
 Courtney Kane - Anchor
 Kristie Keleshian - Reporter
 Natalie Paterson - Reporter
 Christine Persichette - Morning Anchor

Long Island 
 Cecilia Dowd - Reporter
 Nicole Edenedo - Morning Traffic Anchor / Entertainment Reporter
 Chelsea Irizarry - Reporter
 Courtney Kane - Nighttime Anchor
 Claire Kerr - Reporter
 Christa Lauri - Daytime Anchor
 Ron Lee - Reporter
 Kristin McNally - Reporter
 CJ Papa - Morning Anchor
 Ray Raimundi - Reporter
 Lorin Richardson - Morning Traffic Anchor / Reporter
 Archie Snowden - Reporter
 Vanessa Tyler - Nighttime Anchor
 Jackie Zabielski - Daytime Anchor

Lower Hudson Valley 
 Nicole Edenedo - Morning Traffic Anchor / Entertainment Reporter
 Mike Gilliam - Nighttime Anchor
 Courtney Kane - Nighttime Anchor
 Christa Lauri - Daytime Anchor
 CJ Papa - Morning Anchor
 Lorin Richardson - Morning Traffic Anchor / Reporter
 Janine Ros - Weekend Morning Anchor
 Vanessa Tyler - Weekend Evening Anchor
 Jackie Zabielski - Daytime Anchor

See also
News 12 Networks
Verizon Communications
Verizon FiOS

References

External links

Verizon Communications
Television channels and stations established in 2009
Television channels and stations disestablished in 2019
Sports television networks in the United States
Defunct local cable stations in the United States
Sports in New York City
24-hour television news channels in the United States
Television stations in New Jersey
Television stations in New York (state)